Sphinx Club may refer to:

 Sphinx Club (Baltimore), jazz club in Baltimore, USA
 Sphinx Club (New York), former gentlemen's club in New York City, USA
 Sphinx Club (Harvard College), former student club at Harvard, USA